Decipher is the second album by Dutch symphonic metal band After Forever, released on 27 December 2001. In this album, the band make use of live classical instruments and a complete choir to back up the soprano voice of lead singer Floor Jansen. Thrown in the mix are also a duet of soprano and tenor voices in "Imperfect Tenses" and the recording of the late Israeli PM Yizhak Rabin's voice during the 1994 Israel–Jordan peace treaty signing ceremony in "Forlorn Hope". This is the last After Forever album with guitarist and founder Mark Jansen, who left the band soon after its release.

In 2003, the album was reissued in a limited edition of 5,000 copies worldwide. The limited edition in digipack had an extended booklet, a sticker with new artwork and two live bonus tracks. It was again reissued in 2012 by the re-financed Transmission Records, this time as a two-disc set containing previously unreleased studio sessions, single edits and a handful of demo recordings.

Track listing

Personnel

After Forever
 Floor Jansen – vocals
 Mark Jansen – guitars, grunts
 Sander Gommans – guitars
 Luuk van Gerven – bass guitar
 Lando van Gils – keyboards
 André Borgman – drums, acoustic guitars

Production
 Stephen van Haestregt – production, engineer
 Oscar Holleman – additional production, mixing
 Hans van Vuuren – executive producer, coordination and research
 Peter van 't Riet – mastering

Additional musicians
 Cees' Kieboom – piano, keyboards
 Ebred Reijen – solo violin
 Noemi Bodden – violin
 Janine Baller – viola
 Carla Schrijner – violoncello
 Roxanne Steffen – double bass
 Irma Kort – oboe on "Intrinsic" and "My Pledge of Allegiance #1"
 Jack Pisters – sitar on "My Pledge of Allegiance #2"
 Rein Kolpa – tenor vocals on "Imperfect Tenses"
 Hans Cassa – choral bass vocals
 Caspar de Jonge – choral tenor vocals
 Marga Okhuizen – choral alto vocals
 Ellen Bakker – choral soprano vocals
 Damian Wilson – vocals on "Imperfect Tenses" (The Album bonus track version) and "Who Wants to Live Forever"
 Arjen Anthony Lucassen – guitar and keyboards on "Who Wants to Live Forever", all instruments on "Who Wants to Live Forever" (session version)

References

2001 albums
After Forever albums
Transmission (record label) albums